A denial is an assertion that an allegation is not true.

Denial may also refer to:

Film and television
The Denial, a 1925 American silent drama film 
Denial (1990 film), an American drama by Erin Dignam
Denial (1998 film), an American drama by Adam Rifkin
Denial (2016 film), a British-American biographical drama directed by Mick Jackson
"Denial" (Young Justice), a television episode

Literature
Denial (novel), a 2005 novel by Stuart M. Kaminsky
Denial (Tedlow book), a 2010 business book by Richard S. Tedlow
"Denial" (poem), a 1931 poem by Giorgos Seferis
Denial, a 2004 novel by David Belbin
Denial, a 1998 novel by Peter James
Denial, a 2011 novel by Coleen Nolan

Music
"Denial" (Sevendust song), 1999
"Denial" (Sugababes song), 2008
"Denial", a song by New Order from Movement, 1981

Other uses
Denial (Freud), a psychological defense mechanism
Denial Ahmetović (born 1995), Bosnian pop singer
Denial eSports, a defunct professional eSports organization

See also

Denialism, the rejection of propositions on which a scientific or scholarly consensus exists
"In Denial", a 1999 song by Pet Shop Boys from Nightlife

Deny (disambiguation)
Denier (disambiguation)
Refusal (disambiguation)